Prick is the sixth studio album by the Melvins which was released in 1994 through Amphetamine Reptile Records under the name ƧИIV⅃ƎM. It has been said that because the Melvins already had a contract with Atlantic Records, Prick was released with the band name in mirror writing.

Background
The album displays a distinctly experimental quality, with an eclectic selection including field recordings, electronic effects and loops, band jam sessions, a stereotypical drum solo that segues into an archetypal heavy metal guitar solo, and a track that's introduced as "pure digital silence"—followed by silence for a minute. Singer/guitarist Buzz Osborne has stated that Prick is "a total noise crap record we did strictly for the weirdness factor. Complete and utter nonsense, a total joke."

The band claimed that they wanted to call the album Kurt Kobain but changed it after Cobain's death to eliminate the possibility of people mistaking it for a tribute record. They implied that Cobain, a friend and collaborator since their teenage years in rural Washington, was actually the titular "prick", because he died and therefore forced them to change the album's name.

Track listing
All songs written by The Melvins.

Personnel
Mark D - producer
Dale C - producer
King B - producer

Additional personnel
Konstantin Johannes - engineer
Mackie Osborne - art

References

Melvins albums
1994 albums
Amphetamine Reptile Records albums
Experimental rock albums by American artists
Sound collage albums